The 1996 World Series of Poker (WSOP) was a series of poker tournaments held at Binion's Horseshoe. The 1996 World Series featured the first woman to win an open event outright when Barbara Enright won the $2,500 Pot Limit Hold'em event.

Preliminary events

Main Event
There were 295 entrants to the main event. Each entrant paid $10,000 to enter the tournament.

Final table

*Career statistics prior to the beginning of the 1996 Main Event.

Final table results

Other High Finishes
NB: This list is restricted to top 30 finishers with an existing Wikipedia entry.

External links
1996 World Series of Poker at Conjelco.com

World Series of Poker
World Series of Poker